Jeremy Bates was the defending champion, but retired from his opening round match.

Greg Rusedski won the title, defeating Lars Rehmann, who retired from the final while Rusedski held a 6–4, 3–1 lead.

Seeds

Draw

Finals

Top half

Bottom half

References

External links
 Main draw

Seoul Open
1995 ATP Tour
1995 Seoul Open